Paul Frederick Linden (born 29 January 1947)  is a mathematician specialising in fluid dynamics. He was the third G. I. Taylor Professor of Fluid Mechanics at the University of Cambridge, inaugural Blasker Distinguished Professor Emeritus of Environmental Science and Engineering at the UC San Diego and a fellow of Downing College.

Education
Linden earned his PhD from the University of Cambridge in 1972, under the supervision of Stewart Turner. His thesis was entitled The Effect of Turbulence and Shear on Salt Fingers.

Awards and honours 
He was elected a  Fellow of the American Physical Society in 2003.
Linden was elected a Fellow of the Royal Society (FRS) in 2007. His certificate of election reads:

References

External links 
 
 
 

1947 births
Living people
Fluid dynamicists
Fellows of Downing College, Cambridge
Fellows of the Royal Society
Fellows of the American Physical Society
20th-century British mathematicians
21st-century British mathematicians
University of California, San Diego faculty
Professors of the University of Cambridge